Local Route 28 Yeongju–Donghae Line is a local route of South Korea that connecting Yeongju, North Gyeongsang Province to Donghae, Gangwon Province.

History
This route was established on 17 November 2008.

Stopovers
 North Gyeongsang Province
 Yeongju
 North Chungcheong Province
 Danyang County
 Gangwon Province
 Yeongwol County - Jeongseon County - Samcheok - Donghae

Major intersections 

 (■): Motorway
IS: Intersection, IC: Interchange

North Gyeongsang Province

North Chungcheong Province

Gangwon Province

See also 
 Roads and expressways in South Korea
 Transportation in South Korea

References

External links 
 MOLIT South Korean Government Transport Department

28
Roads in North Gyeongsang
Roads in North Chungcheong
Roads in Gangwon